Xiapu railway station is a railway station located in Xiapu County, Ningde City, Fujian Province, China, on the Wenzhou-Fuzhou Railway operated by Nanchang Railway Bureau, China Railway Corporation.

References 

Railway stations in Fujian
Railway stations in China opened in 2009